Sometimes I'm Happy, Sometimes I'm Blue may refer to

 "Sometimes I'm Happy (Sometimes I'm Blue)", a 1927 popular song by Vincent Youmans and Irving Caesar
 Sometimes I'm Happy, Sometimes I'm Blue (Jill Corey album), 1957
 Sometimes I'm Happy, Sometimes I'm Blue, an album by Eddy Arnold